Nugget Markets is a family-owned upscale supermarket chain operating within the greater Sacramento metropolitan area as well as in Marin and Sonoma counties in Northern California. It is headquartered in Davis, California. As of August 2022, the company operates 13 of its flagship Nugget Markets-brand stores, as well as Sonoma Market in Sonoma, Fork Lift by Nugget Markets in Cameron Park, and Food 4 Less in Woodland.

History 
In 1926, Nugget Markets opened its first store in Woodland, California by the father-and-son team of William and Mack Stille. Mack Stille ran most of the day-to-day operations and introduced many unconventional policies to the store, such as incorporating meat departments, installing refrigerated produce cases, and employing checkout stands equipped with power belts.

In the late 1970s, under the leadership of Mack's son, Gene, and grandson, Eric, the company began its expansion outside the local Woodland community by opening a Nugget Markets store in neighboring Davis. In 1984, Nugget Markets acquired a pair of Sacramento Alpha Beta grocery stores and converted them into Nugget Markets, one in the Greenhaven-Pocket neighborhood, the other in Foothill Farms on Hillsdale Blvd. In the early 1990s, Nugget Markets opened its first Food 4 Less franchise in Vallejo, California.  In the late 1990s, Nugget Markets developed their Fresh to Market concept, pairing European-style open-air marketing with higher-end products and specialty departments, such as their Cheese Specialists, Wine Stewards, Pastry Chefs in a full-range Bakery, Full-Service Kitchen, Healthy Living Department, dedicated Seafood butcher and a Juice & Espresso Bar.

In 2006, Nugget Markets leased / bought 8 former Ralphs stores in and around Sacramento.

In 2015, Nugget Markets acquired Paradise Foods with locations in Novato, Corte Madera and Tiburon. Also in 2015, Nugget Markets debuted its new “Fork Lift” market concept which was a hybrid of its Nugget and Food 4 Less brands within the same store.

In 2016, Nugget Markets acquired Sonoma Market and Glen Ellen Village Market, both located in Sonoma County.

In 2019, Nugget Markets patriarch Gene Stille died.

In 2020, Nugget Markets moved its corporate headquarters from Woodland, California to Davis, California.

In 2021, Nugget Markets was ranked #24 on Fortune's list of "100 Best Companies to Work For," its 16th year on the list.

Branding 
Unique to Nugget Markets is their architectural feature at the entrance of new stores, which include a tower and/or a robed woman with a basket of food above her head. The robed woman, in particular, became the corporate logo and mascot of the company.

Locations

Active Nugget Markets stores
 Downtown Woodland – 157 Main St., Woodland, California
 El Macero – 409 Mace Blvd., Davis, California
 Lake Crest – 1040 Florin Rd., Sacramento, California
 Southport – 2000 Town Center Plaza, West Sacramento, California
 Park Plaza – 771 Pleasant Grove Blvd., Roseville, California
 Browns Valley – 130 Browns Valley Pkwy., Vacaville, California
 Oak Tree – 1414 E. Covell Blvd., Davis, California
 El Dorado Hills – 4500 Post St., El Dorado Hills, California
 Elk Grove – 7101 Elk Grove Blvd., Elk Grove, California
 Blue Oaks – 1509 Blue Oaks Blvd., Roseville, California
 Tiburon – 1 Blackfield Drive, Tiburon, California
 Corte Madera - 5627 Paradise Drive, Corte Madera, California
 Novato - 470 Ignacio Blvd., Novato, California

Active Sonoma Market store
 500 West Napa St., Sonoma, California

Active Fork Lift by Nugget Markets store
 3333 Coach Ln., Cameron Park, California

Active Food 4 Less store
 451 Pioneer Rd., Woodland, California

Defunct stores
 Riverside – 6419 Riverside Blvd., Sacramento, California
 Hillsdale – 5731 Hillsdale Blvd., Sacramento, California

Unfinished stores 
 Vallejo – Was to have opened in the northeastern section of Vallejo, California. Plans cancelled in November 2006.

References

Supermarkets of the United States
Food and drink companies based in California
Retail companies based in California
Companies based in Yolo County, California
Woodland, California
American companies established in 1926
Food and drink companies established in 1926
Retail companies established in 1926
1926 establishments in California
Family-owned companies of the United States